Neil Anthony Young (born 31 August 1973) is a former professional footballer who played as a defender. He is an older brother of footballer Luke Young.

Career
Young was born in Harlow. He played over 400 league games for AFC Bournemouth, some as captain, after joining in 1994 from Tottenham Hotspur. He played primarily at right-back although played at centre-back in the latter part of his Bournemouth career. Young was considered an attacking full back who would often support the right winger. He received a testimonial in 2005 against his brother's Charlton Athletic side.

On 2 November 2007, he signed a one-month loan deal at Weymouth, linking up with former Bournemouth teammate Jason Tindall. He had his loan extended to a second month, although he was recalled by Bournemouth soon after.

At the end of the 2007–08 season he left England and moved to Australia after over 14 years' service for the club. In 2009, he signed with South Australian Premier League club Cumberland United.

Career statistics

References

External links

1973 births
Living people
Association football defenders
English footballers
Tottenham Hotspur F.C. players
AFC Bournemouth players
Weymouth F.C. players
Cumberland United FC players
English Football League players
FFSA Super League players
Sportspeople from Harlow